Viktoriya Nazymovna Adiyeva (born 24 April 1981) later Viktoriya Mussatayeva is a Kazakhstani ice hockey player. She competed in the 2002 Winter Olympics.

References

External links
 

1981 births
Living people
Ice hockey players at the 2002 Winter Olympics
Kazakhstani women's ice hockey defencemen
Olympic ice hockey players of Kazakhstan
Asian Games gold medalists for Kazakhstan
Asian Games bronze medalists for Kazakhstan
Ice hockey players at the 1999 Asian Winter Games
Ice hockey players at the 2003 Asian Winter Games
Ice hockey players at the 2007 Asian Winter Games
Ice hockey players at the 2011 Asian Winter Games
Medalists at the 1999 Asian Winter Games
Medalists at the 2003 Asian Winter Games
Medalists at the 2007 Asian Winter Games
Medalists at the 2011 Asian Winter Games
Asian Games medalists in ice hockey
People from Taldykorgan
20th-century Kazakhstani women
21st-century Kazakhstani women